Bruno Sroka (born July 9, 1976 in France) is a French male kitesurfer and adventurer. He is 3 times winner of the World Cup as well as 3 times European Champion in course racing. Bruno Sroka is the first and only man that crossed the Cape Horn by kitesurf and the first one that realized the unique Way of Peace project in the Gulf of Aqaba.

Biography
Bruno was born in Clamart(around Paris), France on June 9, 1976. When Bruno was 2 years old his father took the young child for his first windsurf along with him on his board.  By age 4 he was skiing and at 9 he was windsurfing independently. Early on Bruno identified sports as his favorite thing and that he wanted to teach when he was older. As time went on, he decided to pursue water sports as this was the activity he loved the most. These included tennis, swimming and athletics. At the age of 9 Bruno has got his first windsurfing gear and spent most of his summers in Normandy, France practicing his windsurfing skills.

In 1996 Bruno met Manu Bertin (one of the first kitesurfing inventors/kitesurf developers) and was inspired by his passion for new water sport — kitesurfing. At the age of 23 Bruno started his kitesurfing career with Vice Champion title in Freestyle in 2001 Dunkerque, France. After his first victory, Bruno participated in further competitions and won 6th place in the World Freestyle Championship in 2002. In the same year Bruno Sroka and Fabienne d'Ortoli invented the first  kitesurfing tandem in the world.

In 2004 Bruno won second place in Wave Master (World Championship KPWT). He was a speed crossing French champion in 2005, 2006, 2007 and also in 2005 he obtained his Master diploma from Brest University, Bretagne. In 2007 Bruno won three kitesurfing titles of the year: French Champion, European Champion and World Champion. In 2009 he was one of the two competitors that won both the PKRA and KPWT tours and became a winner of IKA World Cup ranking where Bruno Sroka and Paolo Rista (windsurfer/ boat designer) developed new, revolutionary kite race boards. In 2010 Bruno carried on with the IKA World Cup title  and finished 3rd in the World Championship in addition to the European Championship and European Cup. In 2011 he won third place in the World Slalom Championship (Murcia, Spain) and placed third in the European Championship in course racing in Sopot, Poland.

Apart from competitions, some of Bruno's other achievements are:
1. In 2008 April 8 he became the first and only man that crossed the Cape Horn(the strait between South America and Antarctica) by kitesurf. Bruno kited for over 9 hours non-stop in one of the most hazardous areas with strong winds, large waves and strong current waters.
2. In 2009 January 18 he realized a unique project in the gulf of Aqaba for war-torn countries. Bruno printed a blue dove on his white kite and kited along Israel, Egypt and Jordan with an intention to deliver a peace message through his Way of Peace  project. 
3.In May 2011 Bruno attracted the public's attention for two French hostages journalists Stephane Taponier and Herve Ghesquiere foreign hostages in Afghanistan. For the 500-day anniversary of their kidnapping Bruno printed the portraits of the two journalists on his kite and crossed the most dangerous point of Pointe du Raz, Brittany Brittany, France. This way the kitesurfer showed his support for the kidnapped journalists in Afghanistan via his sport activity.

Bruno Sroka has been active in different organizations and foundations, he's been open in giving his voice for cleaner and safer planet. He is  an ambassador for the "Peace and Sport", Green Cross and UNSS (union national du sport scolaire) foundations.

Bruno Sroka is active in the media world: in 2012 he had twice the article in famous Paris Match, Le Figaro, The Wall Street Journal, Kiteboarder

Titles
2001/02 French Championship in Freestyle second-place winner;
2004 World Wave Championship second place (Wave Master, KPWT);
2005/06 Winner of French Championship Speed Crossing (Slalom);
2007 PKRA World Champion and European Champion in Kite Racing, Winner of French Championship Speed Crossing;
2008 April 8, the first and only man that crossed the Cape Horn by kitesurfing;
2009 January 18, realized the unique The Way of Peace project in the gulf of Aqaba;
2009 Winner of PKRA Kite racing, Winner of the KPWT of Kite racing, Champion of the World Cup and European Championship;
2010 Winner of the IKA World Cup kite racing, European champion in kite racing;
2011 Third place World Kite Cross and fourth in IKA World Cup ranking.

References

External links
Official site
Bruno Sroka- ambassador for Peace and Sprort
International kiteboarding association

1976 births
Living people
French kitesurfers
Sportspeople from Paris
Male kitesurfers